Moon Ga-young (born July 10, 1996) is a German-born South Korean actress. She is best known for her roles in Heartstrings (2011), EXO Next Door (2015), Tempted (2018), Welcome to Waikiki 2 (2019), Find Me in Your Memory (2020), True Beauty (2020-2021), Link: Eat, Love, Kill (2022), and The Interest of Love (2022–2023).

Early life 
Moon was born in Karlsruhe, Germany to South Korean parents. Her family moved back to South Korea when she was 10 years old.

Career 
Moon began her acting career in 2006 at just 10 years old. Moon was a child actress who appeared in both film and television. 

In 2014, the teenage Moon played her first leading role as the title character in Mimi, a four-episode mystery/romance drama that aired on cable channel Mnet. 

In April 2015, Moon portrayed the female protagonist in the web drama EXO Next Door, which aired on Naver TV Cast. She then played supporting roles in the hit television series Don't Dare to Dream and Live Up to Your Name.

In 2017, she starred in the drama special Waltzing Alone.

In 2018, she starred in the romance drama Tempted, based on the 18th century French novel Les Liaisons dangereuses. Her performance won her an Excellence Award as Best Actress in a Monday-Tuesday Drama award at the MBC Drama Awards.

In 2019, Moon was cast as one of the main cast of the comedy television series Welcome to Waikiki 2.

In 2020, Moon was cast as the female lead in the romance television series Find Me in Your Memory. Ga Young also starred as the female lead, Lim Ju-kyung, in the tvN series True Beauty, which aired in December 2020.

In 2022, she starred in the tvN fantasy-melodrama Link: Eat, Love, Kill and JTBC office-romance drama The Interest of Love.

Filmography

Film

Television series

Variety show

Ambassadorship

Awards and nominations

References

External links

  
 
 
 
 

Living people
1996 births
South Korean expatriates in Germany
South Korean television actresses
South Korean film actresses
South Korean child actresses
South Korean web series actresses
Actors from Karlsruhe
Sungkyunkwan University alumni